Zarthus is the ninth studio album by composer and guitarist Robbie Basho, released in 1974 by Vanguard Records.

Track listing

Personnel
Adapted from the Zarthus liner notes.
 Robbie Basho – acoustic guitar, acoustic twelve-string guitar, vocals, piano (B1)
 Ramnad Raghavan – mridangam (A1–A5)

Release history

References

External links 
 

1974 albums
Robbie Basho albums
Vanguard Records albums